In Greek mythology, Makedon, also Macedon or Makednos, was the eponymous ancestor of the ancient Macedonians according to various ancient Greek fragmentary narratives. In most versions, he appears as a native or immigrant leader from Epirus, who gave his name to Macedonia, previously called Emathia according to Strabo, which according to Marsyas of Pella was until then a part of Thrace.

Etymology

Μακεδών (Makedón) is related to the Greek μᾰκεδνός (makednós, “tall, slim”). Both adjectives traditionally derive from the Indo-European root *mak- or *meh2k-, meaning "long, slender", cognate with poetic Greek makednós or mēkedanós "long, tall", Doric mãkos and Attic mẽkos "length", Makistos, the mythological eponym of a town in Elis and an epithet of Heracles, Avestan masah "length", Hittite mak-l-ant "thin", Latin macer "meagre" and Proto-Germanic *magraz "lean, meager". The same root and meaning has been duly assigned to the tribal name of the Macedonians, which is commonly explained as having originally meant "the tall ones" or "highlanders" in Greek.

Genealogy

Son of Zeus
The seventh fragment of the Hesiodic Catalogue of Women, quoted by Constantine Porphyrogenitus, states: "Macedonia the country was named after Makedon, the son of Zeus and Thyia, daughter of Deucalion, as the poet Hesiod relates; and she became pregnant and bore to thunder-loving Zeus, two sons, Magnes and Macedon, the horse lover, those who dwelt in mansions around Pieria and Olympus". The poetic epithet "hippiocharmes" can alternatively be translated as "fighting on horseback" or "chariot-fighter" and has also been attributed to Aeolus son of Hellen, Troilus and Amythaon. A fragment of the Macedonian historian Marsyas of Pella (4th century BC), through a scholiast of Iliad xiv 226 confirms the genealogy as found in the Catalogue of Women: "Makedon son of Zeus and Thyia, conquered the land then belonging to Thrace and he called it Macedonia after his name. He married a local woman and got two sons, Pierus and Amathus; two cities, Pieria and Amathia in Macedonia were founded or named after them". The rare name of his mother Thyia, has been corrupted in transmission to Aithria or Aithyia through the phrase "kai Thyias, and Thyia". Thyia in the Delphic tradition was an eponym naiad of the Thyiades, alternative name of the Maenads in the cult of Dionysus, certainly practiced also in Macedonia.

The mythological chronologization of the Hesiodean passage indicates a time before the Trojan War and Iliad, since then the Magnetes dwell in Magnesia, Thessaly. The Catalogue of Women, which is variously dated mostly between the 8th and 6th century BC, provides the earliest and only reference to a Macedonian element before the 5th century BC historiography.

Son of Aeolus
In a fragment of a chronological work of Hellanicus called "Priestesses of Hera at Argos", and preserved by Stephanus, Makedon is son of Aeolus, as Hellanicus relates in the first (book or archive list) of his "Hiereiai tes Heras en Argei", and of Makedon, the son of Aeolus, the present Macedonians were named so, then living alone with the Mysians. The fragment does not clarify who of the three Aeoli is Makedon's father but Eustathius reported him as one of the ten sons of Aeolus, thus the son of Hellen. In later traditions, Magnes is also reported as one of the ten sons of Aeolus and father of Pierus. 

N. G. L. Hammond, based on the passage of Hellanicus, as well on the Thessalian Magnes being brother of Macedon, suggested that the Macedonian language is an Aeolic Greek dialect. Jonathan M. Hall compares Magnes and Macedon to other excluded tribes from direct lineage to Hellen and later Olympic participants, such as Aetolians, Acarnanians and Arcadians. On the contrary, Eugene N. Borza gives no significance on this mythological figure for any historical conclusions.

Son of Osiris
In "The antiquities of Egypt", first chapter of Bibliotheca historica by Diodorus Siculus, which is based mainly on Aegyptiaca of Hecataeus of Abdera, Greek and Egyptian mythology have been syncretized. Osiris has taken the place of Dionysus in his various myths and expeditions. According to Herodotus Osiris was the Egyptian Dionysus and the house of Ptolemies claimed descent from Dionysus. (see also Osiris-Dionysus deity). Diodorus relates: "Now Osiris was accompanied on his campaign, as the Egyptian account goes, by his two sons Anubis and Macedon, who were distinguished for their valour. Both of them carried the most notable accoutrements of war, taken from certain animals whose character was not unlike the boldness of the men, Anubis wearing a dog's skin and Macedon the fore-parts of a wolf; and it is for this reason that these animals are held in honour among the Egyptians. Macedon his son, moreover, he left as king of Macedonia, which was named after him." Makedon has taken the place of the Egyptian wolf-god of Lycopolis, Wepwawet and in later traditions Makedon is mentioned as a son of the were-wolf Lycaon.

Son of Lycaon
According to Apollodorus, but not present in the list of Pausanias or Hyginus, Macednus is the tenth of the fifty sons of the impious Lycaon king of Arcadia. His mother may either be the naiad Cyllene, Nonacris or by unknown woman. The closest brother to him by region is Thesprotus. In the story of Pindus and the Serpent by Claudius Aelianus, Makedon is the son of Lycaon king of Emathia, "after whom the land was called Macedonia no longer preserving its ancient name".

Eustathius, summarizing the genealogies, relates: "Emathion son of Zeus and Electra preceding the birth of Makedon son of Aeacus" (instead of Lycaon). Strabo just called him archaios hegemon (old chieftain), and Pseudo-Scymnus, gêgenês basileus (earth-born king). Isidore of Seville, "rege Deucalionis materno nepote" (king, maternal grandson of Deucalion).

Descendants
According to Marsyas of Pella, Makedon son of Zeus had by a local woman two sons Pierus and Amathus. In the Ethnika of Stephanus (perhaps through Theagenes), sons and grandsons of Makedon are: Atintan (in the version of Lycaon) eponymous of a region in Epirus or Illyria, Beres, (father of Mieza, Beroea and Olganos, toponyms in Bottiaea), Europus by Oreithyia, daughter of Cecrops, and Oropus, birthplace of Seleucus I Nikator , which is perhaps confused with Europus. Finally, in the version of Lycaon, king of Emathia, Pindus is a son of Makedon, who gave his name to Pindus, where he died, a river of Doris, a region in central Greece.

It is unclear whether these localities represent pre- or post-Macedonian elements, since Emathia and Pieria are older toponyms than Macedonia. Anachronism is not infrequent in later mythic traditions. (Cf. Boeotus, reported as father of autochthon Ogyges)

Name

Classical form
Moreover, the suffix -dnos, either as the "Dorian Makednón ethnos" of Herodotus or makednós, a rare poetic epithet denoting tall, seems not to be attested in epigraphy, or used by Macedonians themselves.

In Latin sources the noun is Macedo. As adjectives the Latin Macedo and Greek  (Makedôn) denote foremost a Macedonian man. They also appear, mostly during the Roman era, as personal male names (cf. Macedonius)

See also
Macedonia (ancient kingdom)
Ancient Macedonians
Ancient Greece
Hellen
Vergina Sun
Kings of Macedon

Notes

References 

 Apollodorus, The Library with an English Translation by Sir James George Frazer, F.B.A., F.R.S. in 2 Volumes, Cambridge, MA, Harvard University Press; London, William Heinemann Ltd. 1921. . Online version at the Perseus Digital Library. Greek text available from the same website.
 Claudius Aelianus, On the Characteristics of Animals, translated by Alwyn Faber Scholfield (1884-1969), from Aelian, Characteristics of Animals, published in three volumes by Harvard/Heinemann, Loeb Classical Library, 1958. Online version at the Topos Text Project.
 Claudius Aelianus, De Natura Animalium, Latin translation by Friedrich Jacobs in the Frommann edition, Jena, 1832. Latin translation available at Bill Thayer's Web Site
 Claudius Aelianus, De Natura Animalium, Rudolf Hercher. Lipsiae, in aedibus B. G. Teubneri, 1864.  Greek text available at the Perseus Digital Library.
 Diodorus Siculus, The Library of History translated by Charles Henry Oldfather. Twelve volumes. Loeb Classical Library. Cambridge, Massachusetts: Harvard University Press; London: William Heinemann, Ltd. 1989. Vol. 3. Books 4.59–8. Online version at Bill Thayer's Web Site
 Diodorus Siculus, Bibliotheca Historica. Vol 1-2. Immanel Bekker. Ludwig Dindorf. Friedrich Vogel. in aedibus B. G. Teubneri. Leipzig. 1888-1890. Greek text available at the Perseus Digital Library.
 Dionysus of Halicarnassus, Roman Antiquities. English translation by Earnest Cary in the Loeb Classical Library, 7 volumes. Harvard University Press, 1937-1950. Online version at Bill Thayer's Web Site
 Dionysius of Halicarnassus, Antiquitatum Romanarum quae supersunt, Vol I-IV. . Karl Jacoby. In Aedibus B.G. Teubneri. Leipzig. 1885. Greek text available at the Perseus Digital Library.
 Pausanias, Description of Greece with an English Translation by W.H.S. Jones, Litt.D., and H.A. Ormerod, M.A., in 4 Volumes. Cambridge, MA, Harvard University Press; London, William Heinemann Ltd. 1918. . Online version at the Perseus Digital Library
 Pausanias, Graeciae Descriptio. 3 vols. Leipzig, Teubner. 1903.  Greek text available at the Perseus Digital Library.
 Stephanus of Byzantium, Stephani Byzantii Ethnicorum quae supersunt, edited by August Meineike (1790-1870), published 1849. A few entries from this important ancient handbook of place names have been translated by Brady Kiesling. Online version at the Topos Text Project.
 Strabo, The Geography of Strabo. Edition by H.L. Jones. Cambridge, Mass.: Harvard University Press; London: William Heinemann, Ltd. 1924. Online version at the Perseus Digital Library.
 Strabo, Geographica edited by A. Meineke. Leipzig: Teubner. 1877. Greek text available at the Perseus Digital Library.
 Tzetzes, John, Book of Histories, Book II-IV translated by Gary Berkowitz from the original Greek of T. Kiessling's edition of 1826. Online version at theio.com

Deucalionids
Children of Zeus
Sons of Lycaon
Princes in Greek mythology
Kings in Greek mythology
Mythology of Macedonia (ancient kingdom)
Arcadian mythology